"Darlin' Don't Go" is a song by the American country blues singer Sundance Head, recorded for his album Soul Country in 2015. It was later re-recorded and released as his winning single from The Voice, the popular singing competition. The song is written solely by Head.

Charts

Release history

References

2016 singles
2016 songs
Country ballads
Soul ballads
Republic Records singles